Cyphoma sedlaki is a species of sea snail in the family Ovulidae, the ovulids, cowry allies or false cowries.

Description
The maximum recorded shell length is 26.9 mm.

Habitat
It has been recorded at depths of 1.5 m.

References

Ovulidae
Gastropods described in 1979